Trigonoptera quadrimaculata is a species of beetle in the family Cerambycidae. It was described by Nonfried in 1894. It is known from Sumatra.

References

Tmesisternini
Beetles described in 1894